The International Association of Sheet Metal, Air, Rail, and Transportation Workers (SMART) is a North American labor union headquartered in Washington, D. C., was chartered by the AFL–CIO in 2013. The product of a merger between the Sheet Metal Workers’ International Association (SMWIA) and the United Transportation Union (UTU), SMART represents over 210,000 sheet metal workers, service technicians, bus operators, engineers, conductors, sign workers, welders, and production employees, among others, throughout the United States, Puerto Rico, and Canada. The Transportation Division (which has offices in Washington, D.C. and North Olmsted, Ohio) represents employees on Class I railroad, Amtrak, and regional and short line railroads; bus and mass transit employees on some 45 transit systems; and airline pilots, flight attendants, dispatchers and other airport personnel. The Division's 500 local unions organize conductors, brakemen, switch men, ground service personnel, locomotive engineers, hostlers, and railroad yard masters, as well as bus drivers and mechanics.

Members of SMART's Sheet Metal Division design, manufacture, and install their own products. Employed in a variety of occupations – from architectural sheet metal work, to fabricating, installing, and servicing HVAC systems, to shipbuilding and railroad work, they use specialized tools to cut, roll, bend, and shape flat pieces of metal into ductwork, airplane wings, car bodies, refrigeration units, and building facades, among many other products. SMART's sheet metal members complete a 5-year apprentice program that combines on-the-job training and classroom instruction. SMART also offers specialized training and certification programs to journeymen and journeywomen.

SMART is governed by a 17-member General Executive Council with a General President (currently Joseph Sellers Jr.) serving as Chairman, a Transportation President (John Previsich), 11 general vice presidents drawn from SMWIA local unions, and 5 general vice presidents drawn from SMART's Transportation Division. The General Secretary Treasurer (Richard I. Mc Clees) serves as Executive Secretary. The union is structured around nine departments: Organizing, Production, Canadian Affairs, Government Affairs, Communication and Research, Education, Jurisdiction, Legal, and Railroad Mechanical and Engineering (for shipyard and railroad members).

SMWIA history

Early years, 1888–1896
When the Tin, Sheet Iron, and Cornice Workers' International Association first organized in 1888, the founding fathers were not looking for trouble. Union pioneers from Dayton, Toledo, and Youngstown; Memphis; Omaha; Peoria; and Kansas City, Missouri, they organized to "elevate" the trade, advance craftsmanship, and improve wages and conditions. At a time when new machinery, new methods of production, and new immigrants desperate for work were lowering standards every day, these journeymen wanted to be more than industrial "hands." They wanted to be recognized as valuable partners in the industry. "Thorough" organization was key: Once local unions were established in "every town or city where there are seven or more journeymen," one early leader explained, "every tinner in the country, both employer and employee, would reap the benefit, the employer by having more skilled and intelligent workmen, and the employees by receiving better pay and having more time for social, moral, and intellectual development." From the very beginning, then, the IA saw unionization as a "mutually beneficial" two-way street.

Employers, however, saw things differently. In the 1890s they were more likely to lock out union workers and blacklist organizers than to welcome them as industrial partners, and they often relied on armed guards to get their point across. Indeed, the largest employers frankly believed that capital and labor had "nothing to arbitrate," as the Pullman Company famously proclaimed in 1894. "The first members were considered outlaws and an organizer might as well have been Satan himself," an early leader noted. "It was well nigh impossible [for an organizer] to get into the shops," a situation that would not change significantly until 1935 when the Wagner Act finally legalized labor's right to organize.

Employer hostility was not the only obstacle: The fact that some branches of the trade were falling while others were rising also complicated the early union's plans. In the late 19th century assortment work – tinware that included household goods, cutlery, and cans, for instance – moved from shop to factory, and machine operators replaced apprentice-trained journeymen on the job. At the same time, though, the increasing use of galvanized sheet iron was creating opportunities for journeymen employed in furnace or architectural shops – demand for metal roofs, cornices, skylights, and ceilings, along with warm air furnaces and ventilation pipe, was on the rise by the late 19th century. In their case, labor-saving machinery, including sheet iron folders, or brakes, and cutting, rolling, and seaming machines, did not replace skill. But it did give rise to a new class of workmen that the Tin, Sheet Iron and Cornice Workers could not ignore: Semi-skilled specialists who produced materials for the trade.

Although many local unions feared that admitting lower-waged members would undercut journeymen's wages, a referendum vote in 1896 moved the organization forward. "The constitution of the tinners has been changed so as to admit all who work at sheet metal work into their unions," the IA reported." Henceforth, the Tin, Sheet Iron, and Cornice Workers' International Association will be known as the Amalgamated Sheet Metal Workers' International Association."

The rise of local autonomy
The Amalgamated Sheet Metal Workers' new membership categories addressed one aspect of industrial development. But they could not overcome the regional differences that continued to undermine trade unity. Varying degrees of industrialization and urbanization, throughout the United States and Canada, produced varying definitions of "brotherhood." In rural areas where work was scarce, local unions expected "brother" locals to welcome travelers with low dues and low initiation fees. In bustling cities like Chicago, on the other hand, where skyscrapers were transforming the skyline and building trades councils maintained high standards, local unions concentrated on taking care of their own. They charged dues high enough to support strike funds and pay full-time business agents to protect their work and enforce contracts – and they required travelers to pay their way if they wanted to enjoy these benefits.

In theory, the international union existed to balance strong and weak local unions: Per capita taxes would defray organizing costs, general assessments would finance strike benefit payments, and urban and rural "brothers" would share the wealth. Yet reality proved quite different. General vice presidents might be elected to organize their territories, but opportunities were limited since they worked full-time with the tools. Strike benefits might keep a local union afloat, but they were limited, too, since the IA lacked the power to enforce assessments. The fact that some of the best organized, big city local unions saw no reason to join the IA also complicated matters. In fact when the IA chartered a local union in New York City to compete with the independent union there, a war erupted that almost destroyed the Amalgamated Sheet Metal Workers

How to resolve these differences and establish the Amalgamated Sheet Metal Workers in fact as well as in name was a major question in the late 1890s – one that would eventually led to secession (when big city locals decided to "go it alone"), civil war (when those locals organized a rival IA), and reconstruction (when both groups formed the Amalgamated Sheet Metal Workers International Alliance in 1903). The peace treaty that saved the union was based on the concept of local autonomy: Big-city locals would maintain their right to set policies and membership fees "to suit their surroundings," a compromise that reflected economic reality at the time. The fact was the IA needed big-city locals more than those locals needed the IA. And as long as they were able to control their work, they expected the IA to stay out of their way.

Establishing the Sheet Metal Workers' International Association
With that battle decided, other changes were underway: Over the next few years, the general president would become a full-time, salaried officer/organizer; international staff would include a full-time general organizer and at least four special organizers; district councils would be set up wherever they were needed to settle local disputes; and the leadership would reserve the right to amalgamate (or merge) local unions when necessary. Now per capita taxes, not local assessments, would finance a strike defense fund, and a formal dues stamp system would be implemented to protect the membership – and the international union – from careless or corrupt financial secretaries.

The next few years would also see a shift in union ranks. In 1906, the Coppersmiths' International Union, whose jurisdiction included the fabrication and installation of sheet metal pipes, vats and tanks, joined the IA. Around the same time, railroad shop workers were also becoming an important new membership group. But can makers and other low-waged factory workers, did not fare so well, despite the IA's effort to organize "provisional" locals that charged lower dues and initiation fees. Although twelve provisional locals would be launched in 1918, only one was still in business by 1924. Employer hostility, seasonal employment, and especially the unskilled nature of the work made it almost impossible to hold these unions together.

In the meantime, though, shipyard workers had come into the IA, around the time of the First World War, and by 1924 so had independent unions of chandelier, brass, and metal workers. Now representing 75 percent of the U.S. and Canada's skilled sheet metal work force, or about 26,000 members in 1924, the IA was ready to adopt what one member called a "more up-to-date, progressive name" – The Sheet Metal Workers' International Association.

With a new name, an updated structure, and a more diverse membership, the IA was ready to move forward in the 1920s. But no one expected smooth sailing. Railroad shop workers were recovering from the disastrous 1922 national strike. Building trades workers were embroiled in a costly jurisdictional war with the Carpenters to install metal doors, window sashes, and trim (that had once been made of wood). Canadian workers were battling more radical unionists in the One Big Union movement. And employers were taking advantage of a recent economic recession to advance what they called the "American Plan" – the latest incarnation of the open-shop movement.

But, the 1920s also marked the beginning of an industrial shift for the sheet metal trade when Willis Carrier sold his invention for air-conditioning to movie-theater operators in 1922. By 1925 the system was cooling New York City's Rivoli Theater, and within a few years air conditioners were being installed in restaurants, railroad cars, and department stores.

Economic depression, World War II and post-war recovery
The introduction of air-conditioning systems promised to expand employment opportunities for SMWIA members, but it was not enough to counteract the economic crisis that erupted when the economy collapsed in 1929. Expenditures for the construction industry dropped by 50 percent between 1930 and 1932, 35 percent of building trades workers were unemployed by 1935, and the IA was cutting expenses in order to survive: Salaries were cut 25 percent between 1933 and 1936, and another 10 percent in 1937, and publication of the monthly Journal was suspended in 1933 in favor of financing the death benefit fund.

It took the outbreak of the Second World War to revive the economy and put union members back to work. Sheet metal workers were employed in navy yards, airfields, and on railroads. They played crucial roles in defense-related construction, including top-secret projects at Oak Ridge, Tenn., Hanford, Wash., and Los Alamos, N. Mex., where the atomic bomb was in development. They served in the military, often as members of the Seabees, the Naval Construction Battalions, and fought to protect the military installations they built. The fact that SMWIA membership more than doubled between 1938 and 1946 – from 24,372 to 52,932 – reflected the vast expansion of sheet metal work during the war. At the same time, air-conditioning was becoming a necessity, not a luxury, in commercial, industrial, and residential structures, making sheet metal workers an "indispensable factor" in the building and construction industry. SMWIA handled the job from beginning to end, fabricating and installing the ductwork, dampers, and louvers, a job required. The combination of shop and field work was an added benefit: Because construction work was seasonal, fabrication work kept shops busy throughout the year. When winter weather put a stop to "outside work," for instance, journeymen could spend their time "inside" fabricating products like roof ventilators and louvers. In the meantime, though, large-scale sheet metal companies were taking over this work, setting up another challenge for the SMWIA

Traditionally SMWIA journeymen had relied on economic power to control fabrication work: Members employed in the building trades refused to handle work that was not fabricated at building-trades rates, a strategy that forced contractors to deal with union firms only. But that strategy proved risky after 1947 when the Taft–Hartley Act outlawed secondary boycotts. Forced to adapt to change, the IA took a new approach: In 1956 the union established the Organizing Department to bring those workers employed by large scale manufacturers like Carrier and GE-Hotpoint into the union fold. The effort paid off: Thanks to new shop workers, IA membership grew from almost 88,000 in 1954, to more than 102,000 in 1958, to 111,000 in 1962, a 26 percent increase in less than 10 years' time.  By 1970, the union counted over 150,000 members – a high-point in SMWIA history.

The nonunion challenge
While production locals were gaining strength in the 1970s, building trades locals were on the decline. Whether they were hardened by the boom-and-bust cycles of the construction industry or the tough fights to win middle-class wages and benefits, they were no more inclined to "organize thoroughly" in the 1950s and ‘60s, when work was plentiful, than big-city unions had been when the IA first started out.  Unwilling to open their doors to new members who might compete for work when times were tough, they limited apprenticeship training to family members and friends, a practice that strengthened local ties in times of trouble, but ultimately undermined union construction.

First, exclusive local unions lost public and political support, in the 1960s and '70s, because "outsiders" (including African-Americans, women, and other minority groups) had no access to apprenticeship training or well-paid union jobs. Second, a series of militant and successful strikes, around the same time, ultimately priced union construction out of the market, at least as far as private industry was concerned. Fed up with time lost to work stoppages – that numbered almost a thousand a year, between 1966 and 1969 – and fearful that rising building-trades rates would trigger a rise in manufacturing wages, major corporations, national contractors, and construction industry executives decided to take action. In 1969, they launched the Construction Users Anti-Inflation Roundtable (which merged with the Business Round Table in 1972), intending to undermine local union power, increase productivity, control wage rates, and ultimately break the union's hold on apprenticeship training and skilled manpower.

Worse, they planned to achieve their goal by promoting nonunion or so-called merit construction. That strategy was more promising in the 1970s than ever before, thanks to the availability of a wide range of prefabricated materials, new labor-saving technologies, and a steady supply of semi-skilled workers who had been shut out of unions for years.  The fact that the post-war construction boom had collapsed in 1973 also boosted nonunion chances – skilled journeymen with mortgages to pay and families to feed did what they had to do to survive; that is, they provided the skilled manpower that nonunion firms had lacked in the past. In fact by 1983, 40 percent of contract work in the sheet metal industry was going nonunion.

Labor–management relations
For much of the 20th century, the unionized sheet metal industry had been almost a family affair. In the days of independent, locally owned sheet metal shops, union contractors and union workers relied on each other to build a productive industry. Many sheet metal contractors and union leaders even served their apprenticeships together, a shared work experience that often improved industrial relations.

As national contractors gained prominence by the mid-20th century, that relationship changed with the times: With the rise of the Sheet Metal and Air Conditioning Contractors National Association – or SMACNA – in the 1940s, the national contractors group and the SMWIA agreed that "proper labor relations" would insure prosperity for all. Citing their "sincere desire for friendly cooperation," the two organizations agreed to set industry rules by mutual consent: In 1947 they negotiated the Standard Form of Union Agreement, a model contract that addressed the industry's interest in productivity as well as the union's interest in fair wages and fair play.

Aiming to cut down on work stoppages, by 1955 the SFUA included a four-step process to resolve costly conflicts – first through local grievance and arbitration procedures, then through appeals to joint panels, and finally through the National Joint Adjustment Board, which met four times a year to settle hopelessly deadlocked disputes. The SFUA also incorporated joint apprentice committees (JACs), health and welfare benefit funds, and in 1961, the Joint Industry Fund to finance educational and public relations campaigns. In 1971, the SFUA was amended to include Article 10, Section 8, which established arbitration and mediation procedures, and essentially ended economic strikes. Faced with the challenge of nonunion competition the SMWIA and SMACNA extended the partnership through a series of joint labor-management funds. The National Training Fund (later the International Training Institute) was established in 1971 to standardize apprenticeship training and encourage the membership to keep up with changing technologies. The Stabilization Agreement of the Sheet Metal Industry, a comprehensive supplemental employment compensation plan, was established in 1973. By providing under-employment benefits when work was slow, SASMI helped the industry retain a skilled work force at the same time that it helped members support their families. SASMI also paid a travel allowance that made it easier for members to work wherever their skills were needed. The National Energy Management Institute, or NEMI, established in 1982, was designed to capture new work in emerging fields like solar energy, energy conservation, and retrofitting.

Aiming to lower crew costs without undermining skill, the SFUA incorporated a new category of classified workers, or helpers, in 1991, and, beginning in the 1970s, contract addendums for residential, light commercial, and other less-organized markets. The SMWIA also acknowledged the change in market conditions, adopting a market recovery plan known as Resolution 78, in 1982, which allowed local unions to offer concessions on targeted projects that would otherwise go nonunion. At the same time union promoted both bottom-up (or workforce) and top-down (contractor) organizing through training offered by the Organizing Department and the Education Department, through programs like "Youth-to-Youth" apprentice organizing, and through subsidies for local union organizers.

Most recently, in 2009 the SMWIA adopted a Code of Excellence that spells out the union's definition of professional conduct and promises general contractors, developers, and owners that local union members will perform cost-effective, high quality work.

UTU history
Although North American railroad workers were among the first to organize craft unions in the 19th century, by the mid-20th century they faced exceedingly challenging conditions.  The shift from steam to diesel locomotives threatened the work of firemen who stoked the fireboxes and tended the boilers that produced steam power; the automatic handling and dispatching of freight cars jeopardized employment for yardmen; the increasing use of computers limited opportunities for railway clerks; and the development of air transportation and the interstate highway system significantly cut into private railroad transportation and the rail freight industry.  As competition increased, and efficiency and productivity became industry watchwords, the craft union's power to counterbalance cost-cutting measures declined, an economic and political shift well-illustrated by government sanctioned decisions in Canada (in 1958) and the U.S. (in 1963) to eliminate firemen jobs on diesel engines in freight and yard service. In fact between 1950 and 1968, the number of U.S. railroad workers dropped from 1.2 million to around 600,000, a significant blow to craft union membership and influence.

Early years
Determined to return the "human factor" to railroading, as one leader put it, union representatives first launched the idea of a merging their forces at an AFL–CIO meeting in 1967. Recognizing that "We just can’t deal with the industry when we're split so badly," in 1968 representatives of the Brotherhood of Railway Trainmen (organized in 1883 as the Brotherhood of Railroad Brakemen), the Brotherhood of Locomotive Firemen and Enginemen (organized in 1873 as the Brotherhood of Locomotive Firemen), the Switchmen's Union of North America (organized in 1870 as the Switchmen's Association) and the Order of Railway Conductors and Brakemen (organized in 1868 as the Order of Railway Conductors of America) began meeting periodically to hammer out a merger plan.

The idea of an industry-wide railroad union reached back to the 1890s, when Eugene V. Debs launched the American Railway Union, but seventy-five years later it was still difficult to reconcile competing interests and resolve deep-seated fears that one craft would take over another.  Indeed, after eight months of discussion, it was clear that craft autonomy would have to be the starting point for any proposed merger: Each of the founding unions reserved the right to veto a national agreement if their members objected to terms.  With that hurdle out of the way, the merger group met in Hot Springs, Arkansas, on August 19, 1968, to announce "a historic unity plan" to launch what would be called the United Transportation Union, or UTU. Because the founding fathers had long range plans to incorporate other transportation unions, the name was deliberately broad.  "Why sit around and die with the railroads?" as one leader put it.

Support was not unanimous – a minority on the ORC's committee initially opposed the plan and the Brotherhood of Locomotive Engineers (which counted 40,000 members) declined an early invitation to join ranks. But since the vast majority of BRT, ORC, SUNA, and BLF&E officials had signed off on the merger by late October 1968, the agreement went out to rank-and-file members for final approval. Ultimately, a majority in each union backed the plan: 97,728 members voted for the merger, 15,069 voted against it, and on January 1, 1969 the UTU officially counted 220,000 members and 60,000 retirees, making it the largest North American railroad operating union and the AFL–CIO's 17th largest affiliate.

Representing some 85 percent of operating personnel including interstate bus drivers (who had been part of the BRT since 1933), the UTU worked to broaden its base: In 1970, the International Association of Railway Employees, which organized black conductors, trainmen, engineers, shop mechanics, and other employees formerly barred from the railroad brotherhoods, joined the UTU, and in 1985 the Railroad Yard Masters of America also affiliated. By that time the UTU had established the United Transportation Union Insurance Association, a descendant of the Brotherhood of Railway Trainmen's Insurance Department and various other fund; it was incorporated in Ohio in 1970. That same year the Ladies Auxiliary, which was originally chartered by the Brotherhood of Railroad Brakemen in 1888, also affiliated. Marking significant change in employment trends, the group dropped the word "Ladies" in 1999 and offered membership to spouses of female UTU members.

Coming of age in the 1970s and 1980s
When railroad craft unions merged into the UTU they expected to increase their bargaining power on issues like restoring train crews to pre-1960s levels and maintaining crew and passenger safety in the face of increasingly automated systems.

But, the industry's continued financial decline, and especially the 1970 collapse of the Penn Central, undermined union strategies:  While the UTU helped organize the Congress of Railway Unions, in 1969, to lobby for protective legislation and coordinate collective-bargaining efforts, and called a series of selective strikes to protest the findings of a Presidential Mediation board in 1971, railroad executives and the federal government were working to streamline the industry and cut costs, particularly labor costs.  In order to preserve passenger service, the National Railroad Passenger Corporation, or Amtrak (created in 1970) eliminated unprofitable lines, and some 16,000 jobs according to the UTU.  In order to preserve freight rail service in the financially shaky Northeastern market, the Consolidated Rail Corporation or Conrail (established in 1973) took over the remnants of seven bankrupted railroads.  In the process, thousands of miles of unprofitable track were abandoned and railroads were permitted to change rates and service obligations more easily than in the past, a trend that continued after the passage of the Staggers Rail Act of 1980.  According to the CATO Institute, the Staggers Act "marked the most significant change in rail policy since the Interstate Commerce Act of 1887" since it eliminated most common-carrier obligations, granted increased commercial freedom, and generally deregulated the railroad industry.

The significance of this change was not lost on the UTU.  Acknowledging the impact of bankruptcies, mergers, and deregulation, President Fred Hardin noted that "Today's railroad union leader must cooperate with management."  With its membership down to around 90,000 members in 1981, the UTU would "not allow management to use labor as the scapegoat for all corporate ills," he said, but it was "ready to work with management on questions about changes in job responsibilities."  For instance in 1981, the UTU agreed to accept an industry decision to eliminate cabooses on some lines – and the brakemen's jobs that went with them – although it did not completely give up the fight.  And in 1985 it accepted other cost-saving proposals, including the elimination of some 8,000 firemen and hostler jobs and increasing the number of miles considered a day's work for each crew, in the hope that these concessions would bolster the industry and increase business and job opportunities overall.  At the same time, though, thanks to mergers and acquisitions, the number of Class I railroads in the U.S. and Canada steadily declined.

Looking to broaden its membership in the mid-1980s, the UTU now turned its attention to organizing service workers, including sleeping car porters, train attendants and cooks employed by Amtrak – a move that looked like raiding to the Hotel and Restaurant Employees, the Brotherhood of Railway and Airline Clerks, and the Transport Workers Union who already represented them.  Arguing that a system-wide union would provide better service, the UTU left the AFL–CIO in March 1986 after the charge was upheld and sanctions were imposed  "We’ve reached a juncture in the history of rail labor where 15 unions contending for representation rights for 325,000 members is no longer practical," a UTU officer contended.  After the case was revisited in 1989 and sanctions removed, the UTU rejoined the Federation

Facing reality in the 1990s
The UTU had been organized to strengthen the operating railroad workers’ hand in the battle to protect jobs. By the 1990s, though, the battle still raged – although local unions had been able to negotiate relatively soft landings for those craft workers now deemed expendable (through buyouts and various severance packages) and relatively high wages (through regular advances and productivity payments designed to share cost-cutting gains), the fact remained that two crew members – and engineer and a conductor –  could now do the work that five had done previously. And that meant that UTU membership rolls would only decline, even after railroad business picked up in the mid-1990s. That being the case, the UTU began investigation the possibility of new mergers a move that industry analysts applauded.  After all, as the Railway Age pointed out in 1991, there were almost as many unions representing rail employees as there were Class I railroads.

The Amalgamated Transit Union, the Transport Workers Union, and the Brotherhood of Railway Signalmen were all investigated as possible partners.  But it was the possibility of joining forces with the Brotherhood of Locomotive Engineers that drew the most attention, perhaps because the two unions had been at odds for years.  The fact that the leadership of both organizations were willing to collaborate seemed promising.  But the potential merger would prove to be a political minefield – the UTU certainly outnumbered the BLE, but engineers were not as threatened by technology as UTU members were. So they were not willing to be "swallowed up" by a larger union, as a BLE officer put it.  Yet if union executives on both sides agreed, in 1993,  that "it doesn't make sense to have more than one operating union," by 1995, no real progress had been made – even though by that time many locomotive engineers held membership in both unions (which allowed them to work as conductors when their jobs were threatened by avoid layoffs).

Apparently able to work out their difficulties, in November 1998 the UTU and the BLE agreed to form the North American Rail and Transportation Union, a merger that promised to unify the work force but still protect craft autonomy. Yet by May 1999 the plan had derailed – internal politics and mistrust on both sides undermined the agreement.  With tensions continuing to rise, the UTU left the AFL–CIO when it supported the BLE in a jurisdiction dispute. Tensions continued to increase after another merger attempt failed in 2001 and the BLE joined the Teamsters in 2004 as the Brotherhood of Locomotive Engineers and Trainmen – and in the process expanded its jurisdiction to cover conductors, brakemen, and other railroad workers.

The SMART merger
As the history of the labor movement demonstrates, it is never easy to merge or amalgamate two or more proud, autonomous, aggressive organizations. After all, each has its own leadership structures, work cultures, and battle scars from jurisdictional fights. But as the SMWIA and the UTU were forced to acknowledge by the turn of the 21st century, sometimes a new partner is necessary.

For the Sheet Metal Workers, the process began with two 1999 convention resolutions that empowered the General Executive Council to change the union's name (as long as Sheet Metal Workers remained in the title) and streamlined the merger process so that a GEC-approved agreement to bring in smaller union would not require a convention vote. A few months later, in January 2000, the SMWIA's Railroad and
Shipyard Department urged the leadership to bring in a railroad union, since high speed rail, short line rail, and mass transit offered prime opportunities for growth.

After a failed attempt to bring in the Railway Signalmen in 2001, the SMWIA continued discussions with various other unions, and in 2005 the UTU emerged as a promising potential partner.  Having lost almost 200,000 members since its founding in 1969, and in dire need of restructuring to cut costs and improve opportunities for growth, the UTU's leadership believed that a merger with the SMWIA would increase the UTU's bargaining strength, its political influence, and its ability to represent and train the membership. A merger also promised to enhance each union's political voice:  The UTU's history of good relations with Republican legislators would complement the SMWIA's Democratic strength; the UTU's well-developed network of state legislative bodies promised more effective congressional and state lobbying efforts; and the combination of the UTU's PAC (with $2.8 million to spend per election cycle) and the SMWIA's (with $3.1 million) would make the combined PAC a real contender – the 7th largest union PAC and the 21st largest PAC in the nation.

Obstacles and opposition
It took two years of discussions, on and off, before the unions were ready to negotiate an agreement. Finances were a stumbling block. The UTU's structure was "top-heavy" by SMWIA standards and "economically unsustainable." So before any real progress could be made the UTU would have to cut the number vice presidents to lower expenses and raise per capita taxes to match SMWIA rates.  With negotiations back on track, the UTU reaffiliated with the AFL–CIO early in 2006 (with the SMWIA's help), and by spring 2007 both organizations had a merger agreement ready to go.

The document seemed straightforward at the time. Both unions agreed that they shared common objectives, including a desire to improve their members' living and working conditions.  They admitted that their goal was to strengthen their ability to organize and bargain with employers more effectively.  And they acknowledged that the merger agreement had been negotiated in a spirit of good will with the firm conviction that unity between the Sheet Metal Workers and the UTU would bring "fresh strength" to their industries and their political and community-related efforts.

The merged organization would be known as "SMART" – the International Association of Sheet Metal, Air, Rail, and Transportation Workers. It would be governed by a new constitution that encompassed the old, that is, the SMWIA constitution would be amended to include the UTU constitution as Article 21 B. And it would place the UTU president at the head of a new Transportation Division that would include a Bus Department, Yardmasters Department, and Airlines Department. Six of the UTU's current officers would join the SMWIA's eleven vice presidents on SMART's GEC – the remaining vice presidents would be named international representatives or organizers and provide the same services they did as UTU officers.

Although the UTU's Board of Directors voted unanimously in June 2007 to send the agreement out to the membership for ratification, which was achieved by early August, opposition to the merger was beginning to grow:  Back in 2005, a group of railroad workers who favored a merger between the UTU and the BLET-Teamsters had formed a coalition, the Railroad Operating Crafts United (or ROCU). Their strategy was to question the fairness of the ratification process and the value of the merger itself to railroad workers, and it proved effective. The fact that the SMART constitution had not been included in the merger packet would prove to be the opponents' most effective charge. Early in June 2007, the SMWIA's attorney had assembled a document that included the UTU's constitution as Article 21 B of the SMWIA constitution. But since that document ran over 200 pages long, the UTU found it too costly to mail out. Instead the UTU posted the SMWIA constitution on its website, a solution that might have saved mailing costs, but ultimately invited a lawsuit.

The question of craft autonomy became a crucial issue, especially after the UTU president acknowledged his belief that that policy was obsolete, given the technological changes that had decimated some UTU crafts – words all but doomed the merger at the time. Within a few weeks, a full-fledged "stop the merger" campaign was underway. Opponents charged the UTU president and secretary-treasurer with conspiracy to deceive the leadership and the membership about the exact terms and conditions of the merger agreement, charges that were dropped after the leadership fought back with a lawsuit. In the meantime, though, some UTU officers who had supported the merger now joined the opposition, including the UTU's president-elect.

From that point forward, the merger attempt devolved into a series of suits and counter suits, anonymous e-mails, and dueling websites designed to convince visitors that the other side was not only wrong, but corrupt. From the opponents’ point of view, it was a question of union democracy: Because UTU members did not have the SMART constitution before them, they argued, the ratification vote should be annulled, and the UTU president should have another chance to negotiate a merger agreement. From the SMWIA's point of view, the issue was not democracy but breach of contract: The merger agreement had made it clear from the start that the SMART constitution did not exist at the time of the ratification vote. It was always understood to be the product of conforming the SMWIA and the UTU constitutions – and if the two sides had not been able to come to terms on an issue like craft autonomy, for instance, the agreement included an arbitration process. As far as the SMWIA could see, the union democracy fight was part of the BLET-Teamster effort to sabotage the SMART merger.

Over the next two years, the fight would prove to be both brutal and expensive for both sides.

Back on track
Given the bitterness of this well-documented fight, no one would have been surprised to see the SMART merger take its place alongside other failed merger attempts. But in the fall of 2011, when an arbitrator ruled once and for all in the SMWIA's favor, the fight took an unexpected turn. Because the two unions had no choice now but to come to terms, the presidents of both organizations agreed that it was time to sit down together and work things out for the good of the members. As the SMWIA president put it, "they were fighting for what they believed in, and we were fighting for what we believed in.  [But] now that it’s been arbitrated and we’re all in one direction, why don't we put our resources together and grow?" The UTU president agreed:  "It is now time to move forward – discussing with the SMWIA the rights and traditions of both organizations, and to collaborate constructively in finding the most efficient and equitable means of resolving any further outstanding differences.

By 2012, committees from both unions were working together to promote "SMART," to increase state-level political activism, and to use each other's assets to organize the unorganized. "This will be accomplished in the transportation area with the SMWIA's larger organizing staff assisting UTU organizers," the UTU News reported, "and leveraging the UTU's strong state presence through state legislative departments to create opportunities for organizing contractors in the sheet metal and air conditioning industries."

SMART endorsed Joe Biden for president in 2020.

Structure of the union
The union is governed by three officers: a General President, a General Secretary Treasurer, and a SMART Transportation President. The union is governed by a 17-member General Executive Council. Eleven Vice Presidents on the council are elected from the sheet metal locals. Four individuals with the title "Vice President/International Representative and General Vice President", the National Legislative Director, and the President Transportation Division/General Vice President are elected from former UTU locals. Officer and council terms last for five years, with elections held at the general convention.

The union has two membership units, The Railroad, Mechanical and Engineering Department, and the Transportation Division. The Transportation Division encompasses the locals of the UTU, and the constitutional provisions governing the division are essentially those of the old UTU constitution. The two membership units have their own dues, governance structure, and operating procedures in addition to those prescribed by the SMART constitution. SMART headquarters has two departments which serve both membership units, the Mechanical and Shipyard Department and the Production Department. These departments assist members with collective bargaining, research, contract implementation, representation, and other services. The Mechanical and Shipyard Department services bus, mass transit, and railroad workers as well as sheet metal workers in shipyards. The Production Department services sheet metal workers in all other industries.

Gallery

Notes

References

AFL–CIO
Canadian Labour Congress
Trade unions in the United States
Trade unions in Canada
Sheet metal workers' trade unions
Railway unions in the United States
Transportation trade unions in the United States
Trade unions established in 2011